Woods Hill is an historic estate at 1501 Clay Street in Franklin, Virginia.  The  estate is notable for its house, designed by architect Alan McCullough and built in 1951, and its landscaping, designed by Charles Freeman Gillette.  The house is a two-story brick structure, built out of custom bricks laid in Old English Bond and mortared using rough edging mortar.  The property includes a log cabin and old service station (established by the building owner's father) that were located on the rural parcel.

The property was listed on the National Register of Historic Places in 2014.

See also
National Register of Historic Places listings in Franklin, Virginia

References

Houses on the National Register of Historic Places in Virginia
Houses completed in 1951
Houses in Franklin, Virginia
National Register of Historic Places in Franklin, Virginia
1951 establishments in Virginia